The Luxor ABC 800 series are office-versions of the ABC 80 home computer. It featured 40×24 text mode with eight colors (ABC 800 C) or 80×24 text mode monochrome (ABC 800 M). They could also be extended with "high" resolution graphics (240×240 pixels at 2 bpp) using  RAM as video memory.

The ABC 800 came in a monochrome version with amber text on a brown background with an 80 character wide screen, and a color version with 40 characters. The main board is integrated with the keyboard much like the Amiga 500. However the ABC computer has a very sturdy metal chassis.

Storage is usually two 5.25" floppy disk units in 160, 320 or 640 KB capacity.  External hard disk systems became available later (primarily the ABC 850 with 10 MB). Model numbers 'ABC 800 M' for monochrome and 'ABC 800 C' for color.

"Who needs IBM-compatibility?", asked Luxor's adverts. However, most computer buyers eventually considered it a requirement. A certain compatibility could be achieved between the ABC-world and the IBM PC-world with the help of a program called 'W ABC'.

The ABC 800 computer was also sold by Facit by the name Facit DTC.

ABC 802

The ABC 802 is a compact version with 64 KB RAM where 32 KB is used as a RAM disc. The main board is integrated with a 9" CRT screen and has improved graphics, though no high-resolution graphics. Luxor ABC 802 was a model with a small monochrome screen in yellow phosphor, intended for offices. Here with two 5.25 inch disk drives along the side of the display. The grey-brown color was common for all ABC 800 (and ABC 1600) products and was different from the beige ABC 80.

ABC 806

The ABC 806 is a version with main board, screen (DA-15) and keyboard (DIN-7) as separate units. It has  RAM where  is used as a RAM disk, as well as more advanced 512x240x16 graphics.

Performance
In order to see how the ABC 800 would compare to other contemporary personal computers, in 1982, the Swedish magazine MikroDatorn performed a "benchmark" test using eight short BASIC programs (referred to as BM1~BM8) defined by the American Kilobaud Magazine and routinely used by the British magazine Personal Computer World for testing new machines. 

The result was that ABC 800's semi-compiling BASIC interpreter turned out to be faster than most other BASICs used in popular machines, especially when integer variables are used, the results for some well known computers were as follows (times in seconds):

                            BM1   BM2   BM3   BM4   BM5   BM6   BM7   BM8
 ABC 800 (integer)         not measured - see ABC 80 for approximate numbers
 ABC 800 (single precision) 0.9   1.8   6.0   5.9   6.3   11.6  19.6  29
 ABC 800 (double precision) 1.2   2.2   10.0  10.6  11.0  17.8  26.4  144
 
 IBM PC                     1.5   5.2   12.1  12.6  13.6  23.5  37.4  35
 Apple III                  1.7   7.2   13.5  14.5  16.0  27.0  42.5  75
 VIC-20                     1.4   8.3   15.5  17.1  18.3  27.2  42.7  99
 ZX81 in "fast mode"        4.5   6.9   16.4  15.8  18.6  49.7  68.5  229

As seen from the table, the ABC 800 was approximately twice as fast as the IBM PC on floating point calculations, except for BM8 where it was only 20% faster. Using integer variables (only measured for the older ABC 80 in this test) the numbers would be approximately 2-3 times as low (i.e. speeds 2-3 times as high) as for the single precision results in the table.

ABC 800 character set
ABC 800 character set, as described on the user manual

See also
 ABC 80
 ABC 1600 - Unix-based

References

External links
 Luxor ABC 800 serie

Personal computers